Northrop Grumman Corporation is an American multinational aerospace and defense technology company. With 90,000 employees and an annual revenue in excess of $30 billion, it is one of the world's largest weapons manufacturers and military technology providers. The firm ranks  on the 2022 Fortune 500 list of America's largest corporations.

Northrop Grumman and its industry partners have won the Collier Trophy eight times, most recently for developing the X-47B, the first unmanned, autonomous air system to operate from an aircraft carrier.

Northrop Grumman currently leads the development of the B-21 Raider, a long-range, stealth strategic bomber that can drop conventional and nuclear weapons; it will replace Northrop's own B-2 Spirit, the world's only known stealth bomber. Among its other current projects are development and production of the James Webb Space Telescope, an orbiting observatory launched in 2021, and production of the solid rocket boosters for NASA's Space Launch System program. It was the sole bidder on the Air Force's Ground Based Strategic Deterrent program, which aims to develop and build a new intercontinental ballistic missile.

Business sectors

Northrop Grumman is made up of four main business sectors: Aeronautics Systems, Defense Systems, Mission Systems and Space Systems. Prior to Northrop Grumman's reorganization of its divisions on January 1, 2020, the divisions were: Aerospace Systems, Mission Systems, Technology Services, and Innovation Systems.

Aeronautics Systems

Aeronautics Systems, headquartered in Redondo Beach, California, produces aircraft, spacecraft, high-energy laser systems and microelectronics for the U.S. and other nations. This includes surveillance and reconnaissance, protected communications, intelligence, battle management, strike operations, electronic warfare, and missile defense to Earth observation, space science and space exploration. The B-2 Spirit strategic bomber, the E-8C Joint STARS surveillance aircraft, the RQ-4 Global Hawk, and the T-38 Talon supersonic trainer are used by the US Air Force. The US Army uses Northrop Grumman's RQ-5 Hunter unmanned air vehicle, which has been in operational use since 1995. The U.S. Navy uses Northrop Grumman-built aerial vehicles such as the BQM-74 Chukar, RQ-4 Global Hawk-based MQ-4C Triton, MQ-8 Fire Scout, Grumman C-2 Greyhound, Grumman E-2 Hawkeye, and the EA-6B Prowler. Northrop Grumman provides major components and assemblies for different aircraft such as F/A-18 Hornet, F/A-18E/F Super Hornet, EA-18G Growler, and the Lockheed Martin F-35 Lightning II. Aerospace systems also serves as the contractor for numerous space payloads and is the prime contractor for the James Webb Space Telescope

Mission Systems
Northrop Grumman Mission Systems, headquartered in Linthicum, Maryland creates military radar, sensors, and related products, including C4I radar systems for air defense, Airspace Management radar systems such as AMASS, and battlefield surveillance systems like the Airborne Reconnaissance Low (ARL). Tactical aircraft sensors include the AN/APG-68 radar, the AN/APG-80 AESA radar, and the AN/APG-83 AESA radar upgrade for the F-16 Fighting Falcon, the AN/APG-77 AESA radar for the F-22 Raptor, and the AN/APG-81 AESA radar for the F-35 Lightning II, and the AN/AAQ-37 electro-optical Distributed Aperture System (DAS) for the F-35, and the APQ-164 Passive Electronically Scanned Array (PESA) radar for the B-1 Lancer. Mission Systems produces and maintains the AWACS aerial surveillance systems for the U.S., the United Kingdom, NATO, Japan, and others. Northrop Grumman is the prime contractor for the development and integration of the Air Force's $2-billion Multi-Platform Radar Technology Insertion Program. Northrop Grumman also supports the U.S. ballistic missile program, integrates various command, control and intelligence systems, and provides technical and management services, to governmental and military customers, all with an emphasis on cybersecurity. Many other smaller products are made by Northrop Grumman, such as night vision goggles and secure communications equipment.

Defense Systems
The Defense Systems sector headquartered in McLean, Virginia (with a Herndon mailing address,) works on "the entire life cycle of civil and defense platforms and capabilities through a range of services". Vinnell, a Northrop Grumman subsidiary, provides training and communications for the military. In 2003, it landed a $48 million contract to train the Iraqi Army. In 2005 the company won a $2 billion contract with Virginia to overhaul most of the state's IT operations. Later that year, the United Kingdom paid $1.2 billion in a contract with the company to provide maintenance of its AWACS radar.

Space Systems
On June 7, 2018, the acquisition of Orbital ATK was completed and the former company was absorbed in Northrop Grumman as a new business sector called Northrop Grumman Innovation Systems. With this acquisition, Northrop Grumman got more involved in the space industry, which now includes the construction and launch of the Cygnus spacecraft. Until 2020 the firm was developing the OmegA space launch vehicle, intended to carry the U.S. government's national security satellites into space. In September 2019 the company changed the name of the sector to Space Systems, effective in January 2020. On August 8, 2022, Northrop Grumman announced it was moving production of the engines and structures for its Antares rockets to the U.S. from Russia and Ukraine. The move of Antares production fully to the U.S. will happen through a partnership with Texas-based Firefly Aerospace. Northrop Grumman had purchased Russian RD-181 engines to power the Antares 230+ series, and the rocket’s main body was manufactured by Ukraine’s Yuzhmash State Enterprise. The new arrangement mainly resolves the break in Antares manufacturing caused by Russia’s invasion of Ukraine in February 2022. But in addition to salvaging the Antares rocket series, the cost-sharing deal also helps ensure NASA’s cargo missions to the International Space Station keep flying regularly and brings muscle to Firefly’s plan to build a larger rocket called Medium Launch Vehicle (MLV).

Northrop Grumman and Firefly Aerospace will jointly produce an upgraded version of the Antares rocket, which will be known as the Antares 330. Northrop will provide the A330′s upper stage, avionics, software and launch site operations. Firefly will supply seven engines and build the A330′s largest structure, the first stage booster. Northrop and Firefly will also jointly develop the MLV.

Affiliated companies and partners
Remotec, a Tennessee-based subsidiary, is a manufacturer of remote control vehicles for explosive ordnance disposal and hazardous material handling. A UK-based subsidiary, Park Air Systems, provides VHF and UHF ground-to-air communications systems for the civil and defense markets. Northrop Grumman has also worked closely with Antenna Associates, Inc., a manufacturer of Identification friend or foe (IFF)/Secondary Surveillance Radar (SSR) antennas located in Massachusetts.

In August 2007, Northrop Grumman acquired Scaled Composites in which it had previously owned a 40% stake.

In 2008, Northrop Grumman began working with DHS Systems LLC, manufacturer of the Deployable Rapid Assembly Shelter (DRASH) in New York, as part of the U.S. Army's Standard Integrated Command Post System program.

History

Northrop Grumman can trace its lineage back to the beginning of the 20th century when the Grumman Corporation was founded on Long Island, New York. Here, Leroy R. Grumman established the Grumman Aircraft Engineering Corporation in December 1929. By 1939, the company has expanded and relocated to Bethpage, New York. During World War II the company built all American Navy aircraft. After the war it branched out into making the first aluminum canoes using left-over materials no longer needed for aircraft. Later the firm created a myriad of products such as ballistic missiles, all-weather radars, the Apollo Lunar Module, land and sea-based fighter aircraft and Stealth bombers. Originally formed in California in 1939 by Jack Northrop, the Northrop Corporation was reincorporated in Delaware in 1985. After the end of the Cold War, Northrop went on a series of acquisitions where they bought noteworthy companies such as Grumman Aerospace, Westinghouse and TRW Inc. in addition to a number of other enterprises. In 2018, Northrop Grumman completed the purchase of Orbital ATK, which has since been renamed to Northrop Grumman Innovation Systems. Today, Northrop Grumman is one of the largest defense contractors in the world.

1990s
In 1994, Northrop Aircraft bought Grumman Aerospace, which built the Apollo Lunar Module to create Northrop Grumman (NG) at a cost of $2.1 billion. The company purchased the remaining 51% interest in Vought Aircraft Company (Vought) in August 1994 for $130 million taking full control of the company after it had purchased an initial 49% interest in September 1992 for $45 million.

In 1996, the new company acquired substantially all of the defence and electronics systems business of Westinghouse Electric Corporation, Westinghouse Electronic Systems, a major manufacturer of radar systems, for $2.9 billion, and Xetron Corporation. In 1997, the defense computer contractor Logicon was added, which had acquired Geodynamics Corporation in March 1996 and Syscon Corporation in February 1995.

Northrop was the prime contractor on the radical YF-23 which was one of the two airplanes down selected for the Advanced Tactical Fighter but would eventually lose out to the F-22 Raptor. Northrop would later partner with Lockheed on the F-35 and now serves as a principal member of the Lockheed Martin industry led team.

In 1998, a merger between Northrop Grumman and competitor Lockheed Martin was considered but abandoned after resistance from the Department of Defense and Department of Justice. That same year, it acquired Inter-National Research Institute Inc. In 1999, the company acquired Teledyne Ryan, developer of surveillance systems and unmanned aircraft, California Microwave, Inc., and the Data Procurement Corporation. On March 19, 1999, Northrop Grumman announced to restate its fourth-quarter results downward to a net loss because of problems related to its dealings with start-up satellite launch company Kistler Aerospace Corp. In 1999, Northrop Grumman and SAIC created AMSEC LLC as a joint venture, which grew "from $100 million in revenue in 2000 to approximately $500 million in fiscal year 2007."

2000s
In 2000, NG acquired Federal Data Corporation, Navia Aviation As, Comptek Research, Inc., and Sterling Software, Inc.

In 2001, the company acquired Litton Industries, a shipbuilder and defense electronics systems provider for the U.S. Navy. During the acquisition process, a new Delaware holding company, NNG, Inc., was formed, which merged with Northrop Grumman through a one-for-one common shares exchange in April 2001. Both Northrop Grumman and Litton became subsidiaries of the new holding company. The original Northrop Grumman Corporation then changed its name to "Northrop Grumman Systems Corporation"; the holding company, NNG, Inc., changed its name to "Northrop Grumman Corporation". Later that year, Newport News Shipbuilding was added.

On November 1, 2001, Northrop Grumman restated its third-quarter profit after stopping work on two ships for American Classic Voyages, which filed for bankruptcy protection.

In 2002, Northrop Grumman acquired TRW Inc., which had acquired Braddock Dunn & McDonald (BDM) in 1997, and became the Space Technology sector based in Redondo Beach, California, and the Mission Systems sector based in Reston, Virginia, with sole interest in their space systems and laser systems manufacturing. The Aeronautical division was sold to Goodrich, and the automotive divisions were spun off and retained the TRW name.

There were 15 acquisitions from 1994 to 2003.

Northrop Grumman partnered with EADS from the mid-2000s to offer the KC-30 Multi Role Tanker Transport aircraft in the U.S. Air Force's KC-X tanker competition. In February 2008 the U.S. Air Force chose KC-30, but in September 2008 the Defense Department stopped the tanker program and in March 2010, Northrop Grumman announced it was withdrawing from the competition, deeming the revised requirements to be weighted in favor of the Boeing KC-46.

On January 1, 2006, Northrop Grumman opened its business sector called 'Technical Services'. Northrop Grumman and Boeing collaborated on a design concept for NASA's upcoming Orion spacecraft (previously the Crew Exploration Vehicle), but the contract went to rival Lockheed Martin on August 31, 2006.

In 2006, Northrop Grumman had intended to bid for the U.S. Air Force's Next-Generation Bomber. Though it has not built a large manned aircraft since wrapping up B-2 Spirit production in the 1990s, the company has "been working hard to turn that perception around, with the skills and capabilities that back it up." However, by 2009, the teams working on this were told to close, as USAF's focus turned to a long-range strike instead. Northrop Grumman was one of two teams competing for the Long Range Strike Bomber, and in October 2015 won the contract for the Long Range Strike Bomber.

On July 20, 2007, Northrop Grumman became the sole owner of Burt Rutan's Scaled Composites.

In 2007, Northrop Grumman created 'National Workforce Centers' as an alternative to offshoring. Locations are Auburn, Alabama; Corsicana, Texas; Fairmont, West Virginia; Helena, Montana; Johnstown, Pennsylvania; and Lebanon, Virginia. The Rapid City, South Dakota location closed in January 2012.

In July 2008, three of four Northrop Grumman employees (Thomas Howes, Marc Gonsalves and Keith Stansell) were freed during Operation Jaque after five years of captivity following their aircraft crash in the Colombian jungle. The fourth employee, Tom Janis, had been killed by the FARC shortly after the crash in 2003.

In January 2008, Northrop Grumman combined its Newport News and Ship Systems sectors into a new business unit named Northrop Grumman Shipbuilding. On March 31, 2011, this was spun off as Huntington Ingalls Industries Inc.

2010 to present
In November 2010, NASA selected Northrop Grumman for consideration of potential contract awards for heavy lift launch vehicle system concepts, and propulsion technologies.

From 2013, Northrop Grumman participates in the DARPA Tactically Exploited Reconnaissance Node (TERN) program, and received $2.9 million for Phase 1 and $19 million for Phase 2. The TERN program attempts to launch and recover a UAV from mid-size ships to provide long distance intelligence gathering.

In July 2013, Northrop Grumman won a training-simulation contract potentially worth $490 million to support the U.S. Air Force's next-generation aerial warfare virtual-training network.

As of 2018, Northrop Grumman is the primary contractor for the James Webb Space Telescope.

In October 2015, the US Military announced it had awarded Northrop Grumman the contract for the successor to the B-1 and B-52, subsequently identified as the B-21. The initial value is $21.4 billion, and could eventually be worth up to $80 billion.

In September 2017, Northrop announced its intention to acquire missile and rocket manufacturer Orbital ATK Inc for $9.2 billion: $7.8 billion in cash plus $1.4 billion in net debt. On November 29, 2017, the acquisition was approved by Orbital ATK stockholders and on June 6, 2018 the merger closed after final FTC approval. The acquired company assets and naming were absorbed and become a division named Northrop Grumman Innovation Systems.

In June 2020, NASA granted a $935 million contract to Northrop Grumman for the Lunar Gateway Habitation and Logistics Outpost (HALO) module, based on its Cygnus cargo spacecraft. In July 2022, Northrop subcontracted Solstar to provide the wireless-enabling technology to enable a Wi-Fi access for employees and equipment in the module.

In September 2020, Northrop Grumman won a $298 million sole-source contract for the Evolved Strategic Satcom program, an anti-jam communications satellite program intended to replace the Advanced Extremely High Frequency (AEHF) satellite program where Northrop Grumman was a subcontractor to Lockheed Martin.

In December 2020, Northrop sold its federal IT and mission support business to Veritas Capital for $3.4 billion in cash. Veritas placed this purchase in its Peraton subsidiary. The sale closed in February 2021.

The Mars Ascent Propulsion System for Mars sample-return mission Ascent Vehicle contract was awarded to Northrop Grumman on March 5, 2021. For this Northrop Grumman to make a 3–meter long, two-stage, solid-fueled Mars ascent rocket for the Mars Sample Return mission. This mission is to collect Perseverance's samples for return to Earth.

In August 2022, Northrop Grumman announced it was moving production of the engines and structures for its Antares rockets to the U.S. from Russia and Ukraine. The move of Antares production fully to the U.S. will happen through a partnership with Texas-based Firefly Aerospace. Northrop Grumman had purchased Russian RD-181 engines to power the Antares 230+ series, and the rocket’s main body was manufactured by Ukraine’s Yuzhmash State Enterprise.

Finances

Corporate governance 
From 1990 to 2003, before the merger with Grumman in 1994, Kent Kresa was the CEO of the company, who led the serial-acquisition strategy with a total of 15 additional acquisitions from 1994 to 2003, including Litton, Logicon, Westinghouse's defense electronics business, Ryan Aeronautical and Newport News Shipbuilding, and TRW. He then retired in 2003 at age 65.

In 2003 Ronald Sugar, the former chief operating officer, took over as CEO. Effective October 1, 2003, Sugar also served as the company chairman of the board.

In January 2010, Wes Bush succeeded as CEO and became company president.

In November 2015, Gloria Flach was named COO. She is the former president of the company's electric services sector.

On July 12, 2018, Wes Bush announced that he would step down as CEO effective January 1, 2019, and would remain chairman of the board until July 2019. His successor is Kathy J. Warden, who has served in numerous roles at the company, most recently president and COO.

Board of Directors
As of July 22, 2022:
 Kathy J. Warden, CEO and president of Northrop Grumman
 David Abney, former chairman and CEO of UPS
 Marianne C. Brown, COO of Sungard
 Donald E. Felsinger, former chairman and CEO of Sempra Energy
 Ann M. Fudge, former chairman and CEO of VMLY&R
 William Hernandez, former CFO of PPG
 Madeleine Kleiner, former general counsel of Hilton
 Karl Krapek, former president and COO of United Technologies
 Graham N. Robinson, president of Stanley Industrial, a business segment of Stanley Black & Decker
 Gary Roughead, former Chief of Naval Operations
 Thomas Schoewe, former CFO of Wal-Mart
 Jim Turley, former chairman and CEO of Ernst & Young
 Mark Welsh, former Chief of Staff of the United States Air Force

Corporate headquarters
Since 2011, Northrop Grumman's headquarters are in West Falls Church, Virginia (previously Jefferson), unincorporated Fairfax County, Virginia.

Prior to 2010, the company was headquartered in Century City, Los Angeles, but announced plans on January 4, 2010 to move to the Washington Metropolitan Area by 2011 to be closer to government customers. CEO Wesley Bush stated that the company needed to be located close to Capitol Hill lawmakers and officials from intelligence and military communities. Northrop Grumman considered sites in Washington, D.C. and in suburbs in Maryland and Virginia. The Los Angeles Business Journal wrote "In a way, the announcement was not a surprise" due to the trend of aerospace companies moving to the DC area, the fact that the new CEO is from West Virginia and that CEOs often move corporate headquarters to places that they want the headquarters located. A Los Angeles area economic development consultant described the move announcement as a "structural failure at all levels for Los Angeles County."

District of Columbia economic development officials were "pitching the city's urban hipness and proximity to Capitol Hill power brokers" to Northrop Grumman. Maryland promoted its highly educated workforce and its large number of federal facilities, while Virginia marketed itself as a state with relatively low taxes.

In July 2010, the company announced its purchase of an existing building in Fairfax County and its move in summer 2011. It planned to consolidate its Century City headquarters and its existing Arlington County, Virginia, offices into the new headquarters. It employed about 40,000 in the Washington DC metropolitan area, including DC and surrounding Maryland and Virginia.

Accolades and criticism

Northrop Grumman was named Forbes's Company of the Year in 2002. Forbes's announcement credited the company with "master[ing] the art of innovation." As of 2019, the company is included on Forbes' list of "America's Best Large Employers".

Since 2005 Northrop Grumman credits itself with sponsoring educational programs and donating thousands of dollars to various charities.

Many members of the U.S. government have attended company events and spoken highly of the company and its contributions, for example John McCain. In December 2007, Northrop Grumman Corporation was awarded the Ron Brown Award for Corporate Leadership, the only presidential award recognizing companies for outstanding achievement in employee and community relations.

Environmental record
In 2000, Northrop Grumman was designated a Primary Responsible Party under federal Superfund laws at 13 hazardous waste sites and under state Superfund laws at eight sites. The corporation has also been linked to 52 superfund toxic waste sites. Based on 2008 data, Northrop Grumman was the 62nd-largest corporate producer of air pollution in the United States, per the Political Economy Research Institute of the University of Massachusetts Amherst. Northrop Grumman facilities released more than 23,798 pounds of toxic chemicals into the air in that year.

In 2002, the Bethpage Community Park in Bethpage, New York, owned by the company until the 1960s, was closed due to soil contamination with polychlorinated biphenyls (PCBs). The company dumped cadmium, arsenic, chromium-tainted sludge, solvents, paints and PCBs at the site between 1949 and 1962. Additionally, two toxic chemical plumes centered under Bethpage Community Park and other surrounding land formerly owned by Grumman or Northrop Grumman have spread to under neighboring houses. In November 2013, the Bethpage Water District filed a multimillion-dollar lawsuit against Northrop Grumman in Federal Court for the Eastern District of New York for contaminating the groundwater in Bethpage.

In 2003, the company was among 84 parties with which the United States Environmental Protection Agency, the U.S. Department of Justice, and the state of New York reached an estimated US$15 million settlement for the rehabilitation of the Mattiace Petrochemical Company Superfund site in Glen Cove, Long Island. In the same year, Northrop Grumman agreed to pay $33,214 after EPA inspectors found hazardous waste violations at the Capistrano test site.

As a response to many of the previous claims, the company has stood up as an organization for social responsibility. In 2008, Northrop Grumman launched its Environmental Sustainability program and an EHS Leadership Council, to advance its commitment to environmental performance both internally and externally. The Greenhouse Gas Inventory Project was launched to accurately quantify company-wide greenhouse gas emissions and to reduce the carbon footprint of Northrop Grumman operations, in anticipation of upcoming regulations.

In October 2010 the company was named one of Computerworld's Top 12 Green-IT Organizations for its large-scale data center migration effort.

In 2019, Northrop Grumman was named the US's largest corporate contributor to water pollution by the Political Economy Research Institute of the University of Massachusetts Amherst.

Political contributions and governmental ties

From 1990 to 2002, Northrop Grumman contributed $8.5 million to federal campaigns. According to PAC summary data compiled by Source Watch, the company gave US$1,011,260 to federal candidates in the 2005–2006 election cycle, compared to $10,612,837 given by all defense contractors in the same cycle. This donation amount was only behind that of General Dynamics and Lockheed Martin in the defense industry. The majority of the contributions, 63%, went to Republicans. Former Northrop Grumman Electronics Systems chief James G. Roche served as Secretary of the Air Force for two years under George W. Bush. Roche would eventually be nominated to head the Army, but withdrew his nomination among accusations of mismanaging a contract with Boeing and of failing to properly handle the Air Force sexual assault scandals of 2003. According to CorpWatch, "at least seven former officials, consultants, or shareholders of Northrop Grumman" have held posts "in the Bush administration...including Deputy Secretary of Defense Paul Wolfowitz, Vice-Presidential Chief of Staff I. Lewis Libby, Pentagon Comptroller Dov S. Zakheim, and Sean O'Keefe, director of NASA." Wolfowitz and Libby have both since left the government amid scandals.

The company engages third-party lobbying firms in jurisdictions where it has interests. For example, in South Australia it works with lobbying firm CMAX Communications.

Controversies
In the late 1980s and early 1990s, Northrop was the target of several high-profile criminal and civil cases.

In 1995, Robert Ferro, an employee for TRW Inc., a company Northrop Grumman acquired in 2002, discovered that satellite components manufactured for the U.S. Air Force (USAF) were faulty and likely to fail in operation. TRW suppressed Ferro's report of the problem and hid the information from the USAF, even after a satellite in space equipped with the faulty components experienced serious anomalies. Ferro later sued Northrop Grumman in federal court under the federal whistle-blower law.

In 1999, the company was sued for knowingly giving the Navy defective aircraft. This suit sought $210 million in damages. Ten years later, on April 2, 2009, Northrop Grumman agreed to pay $325 million to settle the suit. Ferro was awarded $48.8 million of the settlement. Northrop Grumman stated, "it believed that TRW had 'acted properly under its contracts' and that the company had substantive defenses against the claims."

In 2001, federal investigators probed NG for fraud of more than $100 million, systematic overcharging for radar jammers and other high-tech devices used in the B-1 bomber, the F-15 fighter and the B-2 Stealth bomber.
In 2003, the company was sued for overcharging the U.S. government for space projects in the 1990s. Northrop Grumman paid $111.2 million to settle out of court.

From August 25 to September 2, 2010, Virginia's computer system operated by NG, under a $2.4 billion contract, experienced an outage which resulted in around 45,000 citizens not being able to renew their drivers licenses prior to their expiration. Computer systems for 26 of the state's 89 agencies were affected and Governor Bob McDonnell announced that some data may have been permanently lost. In 2010 Northrop Grumman apologized for the outage, and agreed to fund an investigation.

In 2012, controversy began over Northrop Grumman's Integrated Air and Missile Defense Battle Command System (IBCS), when it missed its first deadline. Since then, the system has had a number of controversial developments. In 2016, a Director, Operational Test and Evaluation found a number of major faults with the system, concluding it was "neither mature nor stable".

International Traffic in Arms Regulations (ITAR) violations
U.S. State Department investigators found that Litton Industries, a subsidiary acquired by Northrop Grumman in 2000, had provided portions of source code used by guidance and navigation system interfaces aboard Air Force One to a company in Russia in 1998. Northrop Grumman agreed to pay a $15 million fine for 110 violations, occurring between September 1998 and November 1998, of the Arms Export Control Act and the International Traffic in Arms Regulations (ITAR).

Additionally, documents filed by the State Department state that between 1994 and 2003, Northrop Grumman failed to notify the U.S. State Department about the computer guidance systems also being transferred to Angola, Indonesia, Israel, China, Ukraine and Yemen.

See also

 IMETS
 Northrop Grumman RQ-180 Unmanned Aircraft System
 Top 100 contractors of the U.S. federal government – $30.1 billion in FY2018

References

Notes

Bibliography

 Parker, Dana T. Building Victory: Aircraft Manufacturing in the Los Angeles Area in World War II. Cypress, California: Dana T. Parker Books, 2013. .

External links

 

 Interview with Northrop Grumman CEO, Feb 12, 2006.
 
 

 
Aerospace companies of the United States
Aircraft manufacturers of the United States
Defense companies of the United States
Electronics companies of the United States
Engineering companies of the United States
Shipbuilding companies of the United States
Manufacturing companies based in Virginia
Companies based in Fairfax County, Virginia
Unmanned aerial vehicle manufacturers
American companies established in 1994
Electronics companies established in 1994
Manufacturing companies established in 1994
Technology companies established in 1994
1994 establishments in Virginia
Manufacturing companies based in Los Angeles
Technology companies based in Greater Los Angeles
Companies listed on the New York Stock Exchange
Collier Trophy recipients